Commidendrum robustum, the Saint Helena gumwood, is a species of tree endemic to Saint Helena, Ascension and Tristan da Cunha. Though it is now comparatively rare, it was once one of the most abundant trees of mid-elevations of the island of Saint Helena in the South Atlantic Ocean. A small tree to 7–8 m, it was cut extensively for fuel in the early years of settlement of the island by the English East India Company. It has given its name to certain placenames on the island such as "Gumwoods". It is one of several species in the endemic genus Commidendrum.

The Commidendrum robustum is closely related to the Melanodendron integrifolium, Black cabbage tree, which also inhabits Saint Helena. The two species most likely evolved from a common ancestor. Today, the closest relatives are South African, in the small shrub genus Felicia Cass. and Amellus L.

See also
Flora of St Helena

References

Further reading
 Cronk, Q.C.B. (1995) The Endemic Flora of St Helena. Anthony Nelson Ltd., Oswestry.
 Eastwood, A., Gibby, M., & Cronk, B. (2004, January). Evolution of St Helena arborescent astereae (Asteraceae): relationships of the genera Commidendrum and Melanodendron. Botanical Journal of the Linnean Society.

robustum
Flora of Saint Helena
Plants described in 1836